Ingvild is a given name. Notable people with the name include:

Ingvild Bryn (born 1961), Norwegian journalist
Ingvild Ryggen Carstens (born 1980), Norwegian ski mountaineer and former heptathlete
Ingvild Isaksen (born 1989), Norwegian footballer
Ingvild Vaggen Malvik (born 1971), Norwegian politician for the Socialist Left Party
Ingvild Flugstad Østberg (born 1990), Norwegian cross-country skier
Ingvild Snildal (born 1988), Olympic and National Record holding swimmer from Norway
Ingvild Stensland (born 1981), Norwegian football player
Ingvild Tautra Vevatne (born 1950), Norwegian politician for the Liberal Party
Ingvild Deila (born 1987), Norwegian actress

See also
Ingvill